Moixa is a British cleantech company that develops software and hardware for better use of renewable energy. In the UK they are well known for producing smart batteries that are installed with solar panels on residential properties. The company also designs its GridShare Software which adds optimisation to the battery systems and can also be used to create a VPP with other batteries such as the work they do in Japan with ITOCHU. GridShare Software can also be used to add intelligence to other battery and EV Chargers to help use energy more efficiently and reduce the costs to the household. They have a team of around 70 employees in London who work on their battery hardware products and GridShare software.

History
The company originally launched the Moixa Energy brand to produce a NiMH rechargeable battery called USBCell. The batteries included a USB connector to allow recharging using a powered USB port. The USBCell AA product, launched on 19 September 2006. Since then, the company has discontinued the USBCell and now focusses on clean technologies in the energy storage and smart charging domain.

Moixa Smart Battery
Moixa Smart Battery systems are designed to be installed alongside solar panels to maximise the use of solar energy in the home and lower the owner's energy bills. As soon as solar PV starts generating more energy than the household needs, the battery will fill from excess solar and it will discharge when the household needs more energy than the solar can cover. The battery can also be charged from lower-cost grid energy for homes on time-of-use tariffs, bringing additional benefits. The battery comes with web and mobile apps which allows owners to view their energy generation and usage. The Moixa Smart Battery Systems are sold in the UK and via Energia in Ireland.

GridShare Software
Moixa develops GridShare Software to work alongside energy storage and smart charging products. The software can be used to optimise individual devices by making smart charging plans for batteries and EV Chargers and the software can also be used to aggregate energy storage devices together to create a VPP and deliver grid services. The software is currently embedded on their own devices and is used to deliver grid services to UKPN. It is also integrated with thousands of ITOCHU devices in Japan and is supporting Honda with their smart EV Charging ambition in Europe.

Previous products
THE USBCell is a rechargeable battery-powered by a USB connection to any applicable device. Launched in 2006 the USBCell has been sold in over 50 countries. It can charge to 90% in 5 hours and contains a 1.2V 1300mAh battery. It can also be charged in standard rechargeable NiMH chargers alongside standard rechargeable batteries. The USBCell is no longer for sale.

Maslow is a building-based home energy storage solution that works with existing photovoltaic panels to reduce energy consumption and offset power consumption to off-peak times. Using batteries charged through PV panels or the grid at off-peak times, the power is then discharged at peak times to reduce costs. The unit can support both AC and DC networks.
The Maslow unit has now been replaced by other battery products. Moixa currently sells a 4.8kWh Moixa Smart Battery in the UK and have a 7.2kWh and 9.6kWh Moixa Optimised Battery System on trial. All units are designed for residential properties to work alongside solar panels and they can also be charged using a time-of-use tariff.

Awards
UK National Energy Efficiency Award  2007  USBCell
Innovation in Engineering Awards 2007  Moixa
PocketLint  Green Gadget of the Year 2007  Winner
Pocket-Lint Best Green Gadget 2007  Winner
Barclays Commercial 'Green Leaders in Business' 2008  MoixaEnergy
Observer Ethical Awards 2008  Ethical Products finalist  USBCell
Computerworld Honors Programme Energy and Environment Finalist 2008 – Moixa Energy
iF Gold Product Design Award 2008 International Product Design  USBCell
Rosenblatt New Energy Awards 2008 Entrepreneur of the Year  Simon Daniel
European Office Product Awards 2008  USBCell
2019  Global Cleantech 100

References

Technology companies of the United Kingdom
Technology companies established in 2004
2004 establishments in the United Kingdom
Companies established in 2004